Keshavarz District is in Shahin Dezh County, West Azerbaijan province, Iran. At the 2006 National Census, its population was 21,070 in 4,780 households. The following census in 2011 counted 20,032 people in 5,441 households. At the latest census in 2016, the district had 19,277 inhabitants in 5,797 households.

References 

Shahin Dezh County

Districts of West Azerbaijan Province

Populated places in West Azerbaijan Province

Populated places in Shahin Dezh County